Walchwil is a village and a  municipality in the canton of Zug in Switzerland.

History
Walchwil is first mentioned in 1283 as Walchwile.

Geography

Of this area, 41.5% is used for agricultural purposes, while 45.5% is forested. Of the rest of the land, 8.2% is settled (buildings or roads) and the remainder (4.7%) is non-productive (rivers, glaciers or mountains).

The municipality is located on the eastern shore of Lake Zug on the south side of Zugerberg. It consists of the villages of Walchwil and Oberdorf (also known as Emmeten).

Demographics
, 29.9% of the population was made up of foreign nationals. Over the last 10 years the population has grown at a rate of 7.6%. Most of the population speaks German (82.4%), with English being second most common ( 6.1%) and French being third ( 1.8%).

In the 2007 federal election the most popular party was the CVP which received 35.5% of the vote.  The next three most popular parties were the SVP (30.1%), the FDP (16.6%) and the Green Party (10.1%).

In Walchwil about 82% of the population (between age 25-64) have completed either non-mandatory upper secondary education or additional higher education (either university or a Fachhochschule).

Walchwil has an unemployment rate of 1.29%.  , there were 161 people employed in the primary economic sector and about 46 businesses involved in this sector.  247 people are employed in the secondary sector and there are 29 businesses in this sector.  451 people are employed in the tertiary sector, with 137 businesses in this sector.

The historical population is given in the following table:

Transportation
Both are located on the Thalwil–Arth-Goldau line.

See also
Buschenchappeli

References

External links 
 

Municipalities of the canton of Zug
Populated places on Lake Zug